Beyarjomand District is a district (bakhsh) in Shahrud County, Semnan Province, Iran. At the 2006 census, its population was 7,885, in 2,428 families.  The District has one city: Beyarjomand. The District has two rural districts (dehestan): Beyarjomand Rural District and Kharturan Rural District.

References 

Districts of Semnan Province
Shahrud County